Hartington Nether Quarter is a civil parish in the Derbyshire Dales district of Derbyshire, England.  The parish contains 24 listed buildings that are recorded in the National Heritage List for England.  Of these, one is listed at Grade II*, the middle of the three grades, and the others are at Grade II, the lowest grade.  The parish is mainly rural, to the east of the village of Hartington, and it contains the settlements of Biggin, Friden, Heathcote, Newhaven and Pikehall.  Most of the listed buildings are houses, cottages, farmhouses, and associated structures, and the others are a hotel, a church, and two mileposts.


Key

Buildings

References

Citations

Sources

 

Lists of listed buildings in Derbyshire